Zeynep Kerimoğlu (born 13 May 2003) is a Turkish football forward, who plays for the Women's Super League club Fenerbahçe S.K. and the Turkey women's national football team.

Zeynep Kerimoğlu was born in Ümraniye district of Istanbul, Turkey on 13 May 2003.

Club career 
 Dudullu Spor
Kerimoğlu obtained her license at age eleven from her hometown club Dudullu Spor on 30 May 2014. She played in the youth teams during her career until 2017. On 2 December that year, she debuted in the Third League. At the end of the 2018–19 Third League, she enjoyed her team's promotion to the Second League. The next season, her team was promoted to the First League. She was named Top goalscorer of the 2019–20 Second League with 27 goals in eleven matches. 

 Beşiktaş J.K.
For the 2021–22 Super League season, she transferred to Beşiktaş J.K.. She scored eleven goals in 19 matches in one season, she played.

 Fenerbahçe S.K.
She joined Fenerbahçe S.K. in the 2022–23 Super League season.

International career 
Turkey U-17
Kerimoğlu was admitted to the Turkey girls' U-17 team, and debuted in the friendly match against Russia on 19 December 2017. She took part in one match of the 2018 UEFA U-17 Championship qualification, three games of the 2019 UEFA U-16 Development Tournament and three matches of the 2020 UEFA U-17 Championship qualification. She capped in 14 matches and scored four goals until 2020.

Turkey U-19
She played for the Turkey women's U-19 team first time in a friendly match against Kosovo on 5 September 2021. She participated in one match of the 2022 UEFA U-19 Championship qualification, and in three qualification matches of the 2022 UEFA U-19 Championship. She scored four girls in six matches.

Turkey
On 25 June 2022, she debuted for the Turkey women's in the friendly match against Azerbaijan. She played in the 2023 FIFA World Cup qualification (UEFA) against Portugal .

Career statistics 
.

Honours

Club 
 Turkish Women's Third Football League
 Dudullu Spor
 Winners (1): 2018–19

 Turkish Women's Second Football league
 Dudullu Spor
 Runner's up (1): 2019–20

Individual 
 Top goalscorer (1): 2019–20 Second League with Dudullu Spor (27 goals)

References 

2003 births
Living people
People from Ümraniye
Footballers from Istanbul
Women's association football forwards
Turkish women's footballers
Turkey women's international footballers
Dudullu Spor players
Turkish Women's Football Super League players
Beşiktaş J.K. women's football players
Fenerbahçe S.K. women's football players